was a Japanese revolutionary socialist who played a leading role in founding the Japanese Communist Party in 1922. He was also a founding member of the Rono-ha (Labour-Farmer Faction), a group of Marxist thinkers opposed to the Comintern.

His most famous work was the essay  where he advocated direct political action and better coordination within the labour movement, while criticising the anarchist movement for failing to achieve any lasting results. He is remembered in Japan today for being instrumental in introducing Marxism and socialism to Japanese thinkers.

Early life

Yamakawa was born in Kurashiki in southern Honshu in 1880. He was enrolled in the Doshisha high school in Kyoto, where he converted to Christianity, he did however not finish his studies and dropped out because of his dissatisfaction with the way the school was restructuring itself in order to receive accreditation from the Ministry of Education. He moved to Tokyo, where he helped to write an article on the Crown Prince's marriage that got him sentenced to two years in jail. This was the first time anyone was sentenced for lèse-majesté in Japan and lent Yamakawa some infamy.

In jail Yamakawa began familiarising himself with Marxism. After his release he met the socialist Kōtoku Shūsui, who offered him a position at a paper he was editing, but Yamakawa declined and moved back to his home town. A few years later, disillusioned with his work, he contacted Kōtoku, who again offered him a position. This time he accepted it. He moved back to Tokyo and started working at the Heimin Shimbun in early 1907 where he met lifelong friends Sakai Toshihiko and Arahata Kanson . He became a syndicalist under the influence of Kōtoku only a month later, but was sent to jail again in 1908. After being released a few years later, Yamakawa moved back home once more and dropped all socialist activities because of government suppression.

Founding a Communist Party

Yamakawa resumed writing in 1916. The Russian Revolution caught him and most Japanese socialists by surprise, he did however gradually convert from anarchism to Bolshevism. When agents of the Comintern tried to establish relations with Japanese socialists, Yamakawa was one of the first ones contacted. He was however initially reluctant to establish relations which could land him back in prison. In 1922, as younger converts to Bolshevism were becoming impatient, Yamakawa along with Sakai and Arahata agreed to found an illegal Communist Party.

A Change of Course

Yamakawa wrote the essay "A change of course for the proletarian movement" in August 1922, which was in fact a manifesto for the new Communist Party. In it, he criticized the anarchist faction which had been dominant within the socialist and labour movement in Japan for being idle dreamers who failed to obtain anything concrete that actually benefited the working class. He advocated direct political action and organization of the working class. The document was the beginning of the end for anarchists in Japan and a year later, when its main leader Ōsugi Sakae was murdered by a military policeman, anarchism ceased to be an active political force in Japan.

Yamakawa's approach was first and foremost practical. He wanted a broad socialist movement focusing on practical gains. This approach later became known as Yamakawaism and was contrasted by Fukumotoism.

Yamakawa became the most influential theoretician of the small Communist Party which, while illegal, was popular among left wing students and academics. In 1924 however, he opted to dissolve the party, arguing that the time was not right for a Communist Party in Japan.

The Labour-Farmer faction and later years

In 1927 Yamakawa and others established a loosely organised Marxist group, the Rōnō-ha (Labour-Farmer Faction), which influenced socialist and communist activists through writings and discussions while refraining from open political action. The Rōnō-ha got its name from its belief that a communist movement would need to be a broad based movement with support from both workers and farmers. It also opposed the Kōza-ha (lecture faction) which followed the Comintern.

Yamakawa withdrew from active politics in 1931, but was nevertheless thrown in prison in 1937 when the government was clamping down on dissent after invading China. He spent the war years in prison.

After his release in 1945, Yamakawa became an adviser to the new Japan Socialist Party and, after it split into left-wing and right-wing factions, became an influential mentor to the leaders of the left-wing faction with Sakisaka Itsurō. He died of cancer in 1958.

Yamakawa was married to the outspoken feminist Yamakawa Kikue.

References
  (Unpublished doctoral dissertation.)

External links
 

People of Meiji-period Japan
Japanese communists
People from Kurashiki
1880 births
1958 deaths
Meiji socialists